Tit Liviu Chinezu (22 June 1904 – 15 January 1955) was a Romanian bishop of the Greek-Catholic Church.

Born to a priest in Huduc village, Mureș County, he went to Rome in 1925, studying first at Sant'Atanasio college and becoming a Doctor of Sacred Theology at the Pontificium Institutum Internationale Angelicum, the future Pontifical University of Saint Thomas Aquinas, Angelicum in 1930.  He was ordained to the priesthood on 31 January 1930.

Arrested in October 1948 by the authorities of the new Communist regime that outlawed the church, he was secretly ordained bishop in December 1949 by other detained bishops. Never tried or sentenced, he was eventually sent to Sighet prison. He died there of hypothermia.

Pope Francis beatified him and six other Romanian bishop martyrs on 2 June 2019 in Blaj.

References

1904 births
1955 deaths
People from Mureș County
Romanian Greek-Catholic bishops
Romanian beatified people
Inmates of Sighet prison
Romanian anti-communist clergy
Romanian people who died in prison custody
Prisoners who died in Securitate custody
Deaths from hypothermia
Beatifications by Pope Francis
Eastern Catholic bishops in Romania
Pontifical University of Saint Thomas Aquinas alumni